My First Album may refer to:

 My First Album (Divine album) (1982)
 My First Album (Lolly album) (1999)
 My First Album (Peppa Pig album) (2019)
 Born to Be (1968), the debut album by Melanie later reissued as My First Album